Word from Bird is an album by American jazz vibraphonist Teddy Charles released on the Atlantic label in 1957.

Reception

Allmusic calls the album "enjoyable".

Track listing 
All compositions by Teddy Charles except as indicated
 "Word from Bird" - 10:06
 "Laura" (David Raksin, Johnny Mercer) - 4:52
 "Show Time" (Bob Brookmeyer) - 6:04
 "When Your Lover Has Gone" (Einar Aaron Swan) - 2:27
 "Just One of Those Things" (Cole Porter) - 6:06
 "Blue Greens" - 11:42
Recorded in New York City on October 23, 1956 (tracks 1 & 3) and November 12, 1956 (tracks 2 & 4-6)

Personnel 
Teddy Charles -vibraphone
Art Farmer - trumpet (tracks 1 & 3)
Eddie Bert - trombone (track 1)
Jim Buffington - French horn (track 1) 
Don Butterfield - tuba (tracks 1 & 3)
Hal Stein - alto saxophone (tracks 1 & 3)
Bob Newman - tenor saxophone (tracks 1 & 3)
George Barrow - baritone saxophone (tracks 1 & 3)
Hall Overton - piano
Jimmy Raney - guitar (tracks 1 & 3)
Addison Farmer - bass (tracks 1 & 3) 
Charles Mingus - bass (tracks 2 & 4-6) 
Ed Shaughnessy - drums

References 

Teddy Charles albums
1957 albums
Atlantic Records albums
Albums produced by Nesuhi Ertegun